Association Sportive Miquelonnaise is a Saint Pierre and Miquelon football club which currently competes in the Ligue SPM. The club plays its home fixtures at Stade de l'Avenir. Since the 2022 season the team has been managed by Loïc Richonnier.

History 
The club was founded in 1949 on Miquelon Island. It competed in the 2018–19 Coupe de France, the first edition of the tournament to feature a team from Saint Pierre and Miquelon. However, they were defeated 1–0 in the first preliminary round by fellow Ligue SPM club AS Saint Pierraise and, therefore, did not get the opportunity to compete in Metropolitan France against non-local opponents.

Honours 

 Coupe de l'Archipel: 9 
1993, 1997, 2000, 2004, 2005, 2008, 2009, 2013, 2021
 St. Pierre and Miquelon Championship: 5 
1999, 2005, 2008, 2020, 2021

References

External links 
Official website
FFF profile

Football clubs in Saint Pierre and Miquelon
Association football clubs established in 1949